An oligomorphic code is generally used by a computer virus to generate a decryptor for itself in a way comparable to a simple polymorphic code. It does this by randomly selecting each piece of the decryptor from several predefined alternatives.
The pieces used to build the decryptor are usually too common to be detected with signatures. However, most oligomorphic viruses aren't able to generate more than just a few hundred different decryptors, so detecting them with simple signatures is still possible. Another method to detect an oligomorphic decryptor is to make a signature for each possible piece of code, group pieces that can substitute each other together and scan the file for a chain of decryptor pieces from alternating groups. Emulation may be used to detect the virus, but it can take more resources than necessary.

See also 
 Timeline of notable computer viruses and worms
 Polymorphic code
 Metamorphic code
 Self-modifying code
 Alphanumeric shellcode
 Shellcode
 Software cracking
 Security cracking
 Obfuscated code

Computer viruses